The Detroit Sports Car Challenge presented by Bosch was the ninth round of the 2008 American Le Mans Series season.  It took place at the Belle Isle temporary street circuit, Michigan on August 30, 2008.

Report
Andretti Green Racing scored their first overall victory, as well as the second overall victory for the Acura program.  Audi failed to win the LMP1 category for the first time all season after one car crashed and the other was disqualified for a rule infraction.  Intersport Racing, the lone remaining LMP1 competitor, earned the class win.  Flying Lizard managed to finish the race with all three of their Porsches in the top four in GT2 to help extend their lead over the Tafel Racing Ferraris, while Corvette Racing easily led the GT1 category.

This race marked the first time since the debut of the Porsche RS Spyder at the 2005 Monterey Sports Car Championships that Porsche failed to finish in a podium position in the LMP2 class; the Acuras of Highcroft Racing and de Ferran Motorsport completed the LMP2 and overall podium behind the Andretti Green Acura, and ahead of the #7 Penske Racing Porsche in fourth.

Race results
Class winners in bold.  Cars failing to complete 70% of winner's distance marked as Not Classified (NC).

† - The #1 Audi Sport North America entry was disqualified after the car failed post-race technical inspection.  The car was under the minimum weight requirement for its class.

Statistics
 Pole Position - #9 Patrón Highcroft Racing - 1:13.483
 Fastest Lap - #9 Patrón Highcroft Racing - 1:15.540

References

Detroit
Detroit Indy Grand Prix
2008 in Detroit
Detroit Sports Car Challenge
Detroit Sports Car Challenge